Constance Wu (born March 22, 1982) is an American actress. Wu was included on Time magazine's list of the 100 most influential people in the world in 2017. She has earned several accolades, including nominations for a Golden Globe Award, four Critics' Choice Awards, a Screen Actors Guild Award, and two TCA Awards.

Wu starred as Jessica Huang in the ABC television comedy Fresh Off the Boat (2015–2020), which was her breakthrough role and earned her four nominations for the Critics' Choice Television Award for Best Actress in a Comedy Series. She was further lauded for her role as Rachel Chu in the romantic comedy-drama film Crazy Rich Asians (2018) for which she was nominated for the Golden Globe Award for Best Actress in a Comedy or Musical and the Screen Actors Guild Award for Outstanding Performance by a Cast in a Motion Picture, among others; she became the first actress of Asian descent in over 40 years and the fourth overall to be nominated for the former category. She subsequently starred in the crime drama film Hustlers (2019) and the film Lyle, Lyle, Crocodile (2022). That same year, following a series of media controversy and mental health issues, she published her memoir, Making a Scene, to critical success.

Early life 
Constance Wu was born in Richmond, Virginia. Her parents emigrated from Taiwan. Her father, Fang-Sheng Wu, is a biology and genetics professor at Virginia Commonwealth University, and her mother is a computer programmer. Wu said that her paternal grandparents were very poor, working as bamboo farmers, and did not have the opportunity to get an education, so they were unable to read and write. She is the third of four daughters.

She graduated from Douglas S. Freeman High School, in Henrico County, Virginia, where she performed in local theater. She participated in a six-month program during high school at the Lee Strasberg Theatre and Film Institute. Wu later graduated from State University of New York at Purchase's Conservatory of Theatre Arts with a Bachelor of Fine Arts in acting in 2005. Wu has cited Academy Award-winning director Ang Lee as an influence. After college, Wu studied psycholinguistics and considered pursuing a graduate degree in speech pathology before deciding on acting and moving to Los Angeles.

Career

Early work and Fresh Off the Boat (2006–2016) 

In New York City, Wu got roles onstage and in independent movies. She made her screen debut with a supporting role in Stephanie Daley (2006). She later had supporting roles in Year of the Fish and The Architect. On television, she appeared in episodes of Law & Order: Special Victims Unit, Torchwood, and Covert Affairs, and had a recurring role as Laudine Lee on the ABC soap opera One Life to Live in 2007. In an interview, Wu stated that she impulsively moved to Los Angeles from New York in 2010 after a heartbreak. In Los Angeles, she was cast in Sound of My Voice, directed by Zal Batmanglij. From 2012 to 2017, Wu starred in the web series EastSiders. She won two Indie Series Awards, both for Best Ensemble - Drama in 2014 and 2016. She was also nominated for two Indie Series Awards, one for Best Supporting Actress - Drama and the other for Best Guest Actress - Drama in those same years.

In 2014, Wu participated in Sundance Screenwriters' Lab with two emerging Asian-American directors, Yung Chang and Christopher Yogi, in what she felt was a unique opportunity to support fellow Asian storytellers. In 2014, after landing a role in one unsuccessful comedy pilot, Wu won the lead role in the ABC comedy series Fresh Off the Boat alongside Randall Park. The series is loosely based on the life of chef and food personality Eddie Huang and his book Fresh Off the Boat: A Memoir. The series premiered in 2015, and Wu received critical acclaim for her performance. E! named her a breakout star of the 2014-15 television season. For her role as Jessica Huang, she received four nominations for The Critics' Choice Television Award for Best Actress in a Comedy Series and two Television Critics Association TCA Award for Individual Achievement in Comedy.

Crazy Rich Asians and acclaim (2017–present) 

In 2017, she appeared in the Hulu anthology series, Dimension 404, and was included on the annual Time 100 list of the most influential people in the world. In February 2017, Wu was cast as the female lead in Jon M. Chu's adaptation of Crazy Rich Asians, based on the bestselling novel of the same name by Kevin Kwan. The film was released in the United States and Canada on August 15, 2018, by Warner Bros., and was the first major Hollywood studio film to feature an all-Asian cast since 1993's The Joy Luck Club. The film was a critical and commercial success, and emerged as the highest-grossing romantic comedy in a decade, grossing over $238 million. Wu received critical acclaim for her performance and was nominated for a Golden Globe Award, a Screen Actors Guild Award, A Satellite Award, two Critics' Choice Movie Awards and two NAACP Image Awards. She is the first Asian woman in over 40 years to be nominated for the Golden Globe Award for Best Actress in a Comedy or Musical, and the fourth-ever female Asian nominee. Wu is signed on to reprise her role as Rachel Chu in both sequels to Crazy Rich Asians titled China Rich Girlfriend and Rich People Problems, which were originally set for back-to-back filming in 2020, although production on them has not yet begun. In November 2018, Wu starred in a short animated film Crow: The Legend as Skunk.

In 2019, the actress starred alongside Jennifer Lopez in the crime comedy film Hustlers, which follows a group of former strippers in Manhattan who rob wealthy men. The film opened on September 13, 2019, and became a box office success, grossing over $157 million worldwide and receiving positive reviews from critics. Wu worked at a strip club undercover to prepare for the role. Also in 2019, Wu starred in the independent drama film I Was a Simple Man. In June 2019, it was announced that Wu would play the lead role in a film titled Goodbye Vitamin, based on the debut novel of Rachel Khong. The film will be distributed by Universal Pictures and Wu will serve as an executive producer on the film. In March 2021, Wu was cast in the Amazon Prime thriller series The Terminal List. More recently, she signed a first look TV deal with Entertainment One. She plays Mrs. Primm in the new movie Lyle, Lyle, Crocodile, which was released in theaters October 7, 2022. She will also appear in the U.S. debut of the play 2:22 A Ghost Story.

Wu released her first book, the memoir Making a Scene, in October 2022.

Personal life

Relationships
Wu lives in Los Angeles. In December 2011, Wu met actor Ben Hethcoat, whom she dated until February 2018. In November 2018, Wu spoke out about online harassment and criticism she had received for dating Hethcoat, who is white. In August 2020, Wu gave birth to her first child, a girl, with her boyfriend Ryan Kattner, frontman of the band Man Man. On February 21, 2023, Wu announced her second pregnancy in an Instagram story.

Activism and cause work
Wu is an activist regarding Chinese representation in U.S. media, and has expressed her support for bringing more diversity into the film industry. Wu has shared her stories regarding times that she had been denied roles due to her racial background, and stated her hopes that her success would pave more paths for diverse representation in the U.S. film industry. The #StarringConstanceWu hashtag meme, adopted by Chinese-American activists, inserts Wu's image into film promotional materials in order to highlight the paucity of Chinese actors in starring roles.

In 2017, Wu worked with Miry's List, an organization that provides essential kits to newly arrived immigrants and refugee families in Southern California, stating in an interview with Teen Vogue that she wants to be active in her care of "people with the courage to make an immigrant journey in search of peace, safety and well-being for their families."

Mental health and cyberbullying
In May 2019, after Fresh Off the Boat was renewed for its sixth and final season, Wu made several social media posts expressing her unhappiness with the renewal, including commenting "Dislike" on the show's Instagram post announcing the renewal and tweeting, "So upset right now that I'm literally crying. Ugh. Fuck". Several days later, Wu clarified that she had been angry at the show's renewal because it had forced her to drop out of another project which she was "really passionate about", one that would have been an artistic challenge compared to her role in Fresh Off the Boat. She further stated that she loved her cast mates and harbored no animosity towards them. The posts sparked backlash on social media. In July 2022, Wu revealed that the controversy, and specifically several private messages from "a fellow Chinese actress" who told Wu that she had "become a blight on the Chinese American community", had prompted her to attempt suicide; she was found by a friend and saved. Wu abstained from social media for the subsequent three years and decreased her acting workload to "focus on my mental health", which included entering psychotherapy. In September 2022, Wu stated in interviews that she was the target of sexual harassment by an unspecified producer of Fresh off the Boat.

Filmography

Film

Television

Music video

Bibliography
Making a Scene (2022)

Awards and nominations

References

External links

 
 
 

1982 births
21st-century American actresses
Actresses from Richmond, Virginia
American actresses of Taiwanese descent
American film actresses
American television actresses
American voice actresses
Living people
State University of New York at Purchase alumni